The Ambassador of Australia to the United States is an officer of the Australian Department of Foreign Affairs and Trade and the director of the Embassy of the Commonwealth of Australia to the United States of America. The embassy is located in Washington, D.C. It is Australia's third-oldest ambassadorial post, after the High Commissions in London (1910) and Ottawa (1939). The role has the rank and status of an Ambassador Extraordinary and Plenipotentiary. The current ambassadors, since February 2020, is Arthur Sinodinos . The ambassador's work is assisted by multiple consulates throughout the country that have visiting and reporting responsibilities, as well as consular and trade matters for the embassy.

Posting history
The United States and Australia have had official diplomatic relations since 1 March 1940, when Australia established a legation in Washington as one of its first independent postings. Prior to that, Australia had been represented by the British Embassy in Washington, either through a representative of the Australian government or simply by British officials on Australia's behalf. During 1929, Prime Minister Stanley Bruce appointed Herbert Brookes as "Commissioner-General to the United States", with a mandate to promote "Australian achievements in economic, musical, artistic, literary and intellectual fields". However, Brookes was recalled the next year by James Scullin (Bruce's successor), as a cost-saving measure during the Depression. During 1937, Joseph Lyons (Scullin's successor) appointed Keith Officer as a liaison officer posted with the British Embassy, with the diplomatic rank of "Counsellor". Officer continued in the job until February 1940 when he became the charge d'Affaires, pending the arrival of Casey as the first Minister.

First established as a legation directed by an Envoy Extraordinary and Minister Plenipotentiary, on 19 July 1946 the diplomatic representative was promoted to embassy status and the Australian Minister, Frederic Eggleston became the first Ambassador. The job is seen as very desirable, and political appointees are regularly posted. Several distinguished Australians have served as Ambassador to the United States, including a future Governor-General of Australia (Richard Casey), a future Chief Justice of Australia (Sir Owen Dixon), a future Governor of Tasmania (James Plimsoll), two former federal leaders of the opposition (Andrew Peacock and Kim Beazley), and a former Treasurer of Australia (Joe Hockey).

Office-holders

Commissioner/Commissioner-General

Counsellor/Charge d'Affaires

Minister/Ambassador

Consulates

From 1993 to August 2012, there existed a Consulate-General in Atlanta, Georgia, which was managed by Austrade. The consulate's closure was due to a realignment of resources "to growing and emerging markets like Mongolia and Colombia." After its closure, the consulate's reporting responsibilities for the states of Alabama, Florida, Georgia, Louisiana, Mississippi, North Carolina and South Carolina were transferred to the Australian Embassy in Washington. From 12 September 1994 to his death on 11 June 2017, there existed an Honorary Consulate in Denver, Colorado, held by Mark O'Regan, an Australian-born Denver realtor and former civil servant in the Territory of Papua New Guinea. From 7 December 1999 to his death on 6 November 2013, the Honorary Consul in Miami, Florida, was Thomas Flynn. Flynn was appointed as an Honorary Member of the Order of Australia (AM) for his service as honorary consul in 2005. From 2002 to approximately 2006, Len Reid was the Australian Honorary Consul in Seattle. Reid is now Honorary Consul Emeritus.

Consuls-General

Atlanta
The consulate-general was opened in 1993 under Austrade management. The consulate was closed in August 2012 following an Austrade restructure.

Chicago
Originally opened in 1971, the consulate-general was closed in 1993 due to budget constraints after being transferred to Austrade, but re-opened under DFAT in 2001.

Honolulu
Originally opened as a Consulate in January 1973, the posting was upgraded to a Consulate-General on 26 March 1978.

Los Angeles
Originally a Trade Commission from 1965, the post was upgraded to a Consulate-General from 3 March 1971 and was closed during a period of budget cuts to Foreign Affairs on 1 July 1976. The consulate reopened in September 1978 and management was transferred from DFAT to Austrade in October 1992. DFAT resumed management from November 1999.

San Francisco
Since 1993, the consulate-general has been managed by Austrade.

See also
 Australia–United States relations
 Embassy of Australia, Washington, D.C.
 List of Consuls-General of Australia in New York
 Embassy of the United States, Canberra
 List of ambassadors of the United States to Australia

References

Further reading

External links
Embassy of Australia United States of America
Australian Consulate-General - Chicago
Australian Consulate-General - Los Angeles

 
 
 
 
United States
Australia